WBSE-LD, virtual channel 20 (UHF digital channel 27), is a low-powered Azteca América owned-and-operated television station licensed to Charleston, South Carolina, United States. The station was a Laff affiliate owned by HC2 Holdings, which acquired it from King Forward Broadcasting in 2017.

Digital channels
The station's digital signal is multiplexed:

References

External links

Low-power television stations in the United States
Innovate Corp.
BSE-LD
Television channels and stations established in 1991
1991 establishments in South Carolina